Megunticook Lake is a body of water in Knox County, Maine. Parts of the lake are located in the towns of Camden, Hope and Lincolnville. Covering , it is the largest lake by both area and volume in Knox County. Megunticook Lake is very picturesque with the towering cliffs of Mount Megunticook rising from the east shore. The public can access the lake from improved boat ramps located off route 52 to the east and route 105 along the west shore. The lake also serves as a public water supply for near by towns.

References

Lakes of Knox County, Maine
Camden, Maine
Lakes of Maine